Girl of Your Dreams is a 1996 album by Bobbie Cryner, or its title track.

Girl of Your Dreams may also refer to:

 "Girl of Your Dreams", a song by Trixie Mattel from the Blonde & Pink Albums, 2022
 The Girl of Your Dreams, a 1998 film about the Spanish Civil War